Pasión (English title: Passion) is a Mexican telenovela produced by Carla Estrada for Televisa in 2007. It is the fourth historical fiction telenovela produced by Carla Estrada after Alondra, Amor real and Alborada.

It's located in a colonial Mexico of 1740 where the love of "El Antillano" and Camila, a pirate and a poor girl who is bought by an old millionaire.

Susana González, Fernando Colunga and Sebastián Rulli starred as protagonists, while Daniela Castro, José Elías Moreno, Juan Ferrara and Maite Embil starred as antagonists.

History
Production of Pasión began on April 23, 2007. On Monday, September 17, 2007, Canal de las Estrellas started broadcast it at 9:00 p.m., replacing Destilando Amor.

On Monday, September 17, 2007, Canal de las Estrellas started broadcasting Pasión weekdays at 9:00pm, replacing Destilando Amor. The last episode was broadcast on Friday, February 22, 2008 with Fuego en la sangre replacing it the following day.

On Tuesday, December 4, 2007, Univision started broadcasting Pasión weeknights at 9pm/8c, replacing Destilando Amor. The last episode was broadcast on Friday, April 25, 2008 with Fuego en la sangre replacing it Monday, April 28, 2008.

Plot
Camila, the daughter of Don Justo Darién is celebrating her engagement to Santiago, the normal blacksmith when all of a sudden Don Jorge Mancera y Ruiz arrives. He has decided to have his “Droit du seigneur” with Camila. After Santiago is hurt, Camila agrees to go with him. Later, in Don Jorge's bedroom, the man drinks himself into a stupor and falls asleep without having touched her. Camila manages to escape and makes her way back to the village, only to find that nobody believes that she remains a virgin.

A few days later, the village is attacked by vicious pirates. Some of the villagers are led back to the ship to be sold as slaves in the Caribbean. Among them is Camila. She had been by Santiago's side while he remained in a coma due to his injury and everyone believed that he was about to die. She had run away to escape her grief and had been knocked unconscious and taken. On the way to the pirate's ship she is raped by the men who had taken her away. The captain of the pirate ship, known as "El Antillano" the handsome man, finds her attractive and in a brief moment of weakness, feels moved to protect her from her cruel fate, but that moment quickly passes. Camila is eventually sold to a bitter old man named Don Timoteo De Salamanca, whose plan is to leave his hated family in ruins by marrying his slave Camilla Darien and naming her his sole heir. His daughter Lisabeta, who was left blind due to an illness she suffered as a child, and sister Doña Francisca despise Camila. Lisabeta maintains a friendly relationship with her outcast cousin who was at first the fortune's heir before his father died and he was framed by a murder he did not commit. While on the run he was taken prisoner by a pirate and made to join their crew.

Not long after, Don Timoteo passes away and Camila finds herself free and in possession of a vast fortune. The hatred for Camila by Lisabeta and Doña Francisca grows since Don Timoteo had promised to leave his whole fortune to Lisabeta. Don Timoteo had also stated in his will that Camila could not give any part of her fortune away because then her freedom could be revoked and she could be made a slave again. With no other choice she plans to leave but before she does she secretly leaves a chestful of coins for Lisabeta and Francisca. She returns to her home, where she learns that everyone, including Santiago, believed her dead, and now he is married to her sister Rita. A short time later, Don Timoteo's nephew, Ricardo, turns up unexpectedly with Lisabeta and Doña Francisca so that they can argue that Camila was not Don Timoteo's legitimate wife since their marriage was never consummated and that the fortune must go back to Lisabeta. He is none other than "El Antillano". The handsome pirate once again feels the need to protect her. Camila knows that he has come to recover his family's money, yet against her better judgment, she falls in love with him, and he with her. Meanwhile, Santiago's old feelings for Camila are rekindled, and a fierce rivalry springs up between him and Ricardo.

Santiago professes his love to Camila, but her heart is torn in two as she knows she can no longer have him. Ricardo, a fugitive of the law and proud, indomitable rogue, has awakened her soul to a love that grows stronger with each passing day, and, for the first time, her body is stirred with the flames of burning passion.

Among the protagonists' family and friends are a number of supporting characters that bring more drama and love to the story. Among them is Ines, Santiago's naive little sister who submits to a night of passion with Camila's womanizing older brother Vasco and results in them being married by their families. While Ines is thrilled about having Vasco as her husband, he remains the same as he always has been and continues to chase after other women, among them is Ursula who is Don Jorge Mancera y Ruiz's only daughter. Ines, though, continues to believe that Vasco will one day love her just as much as she has loved him her whole life.

Another couple that the story focuses on is Ascanio and Manuela who, due to being in different social ranks, suffer continually because they cannot be together. Ascanio used to be a slave and was freed when Camila inherited her husband's fortune and decided to buy his freedom along with fellow slaves Jimena and Claudio. Manuela is the meek and physically abused only child of Don Alberto Lafont who constantly ridicules and beats her. Manuela falls in love with Ascanio and he with her but they are forced to meet and talk in secret since Manuela is a high born lady and her secret meetings with an ex-slave would damage her reputation and her father would most likely kill both of them.

Mario and Jimena are the two sarcastic best friends of main couple Camila and Ricardo. Mario has been by Ricardo's side as a pirate for many years and maintains a deep loyalty to him. While he is amused that Ricardo has fallen in love, he supports him however he can and strikes up a friendship with Jimena, who is Camila's best friend. Jimena has had a very difficult life prior to being sold as a slave but that has not let her bring her down. The two are often teasing their respective friends all the time but are also quick to defend them and come to their aid whenever they are needed. While their friends go through many obstacles, they are forced into the same situations time and time again until their innocent flirtations begin to form into something more.

The whole story is set in the time of pretty young ladies in full skirts and proud gentlemen with a sword within arm's reach. The characters are thrown into remarkable situations where true love and passion conquers all.

Cast

Main

Susana González as Camila Darién Vda. de de Salamanca/Camila Darién de de Salamanca y Almonte
Fernando Colunga as Ricardo de Salamanca y Almonte "El Antillano"/Ricardo López de Carbajal
Daniela Castro as María Lisabeta de Salamanca
Sebastián Rulli as Santiago Márquez/Santiago Mancera y Ruiz
Juan Ferrara as Jorge Mancera y Ruiz

Also main

Rocío Banquells as Ofelia de Márquez
José Elías Moreno as Alberto Lafont y Espinoza
Gabriela Rivero as Fortunata Mendonza
Raymundo Capetillo as Justo Darién
Maty Huitrón as Francisca de Salamanca
Mariana Karr as Sofía Mendoza de Mancera y Ruiz
Kika Edgar as Inés Márquez de Darién
Alberto Estrella as Mario Fuentes
Maya Mishalska as Úrsula Mancera y Ruiz Mendoza
Maite Embil as Rita Darién de Márquez/Rita Darién de Mancera y Ruiz
Marcelo Córdoba as Ascanio González
Marisol del Olmo as Jimena Hernández
Anaís as Manuela Lafont y Espinoza
William Levy as Vasco Darién
Toño Infante as Gonzalo
Lorena Enríquez as Conchita
Antonio Brenan as Crispín
Jorge Brenan as Pancho
Alejandro Felipe as Paco Darién
Arturo Vázquez as Pablo
Carlos López Estrada as Claudio Fernández de la Cueva
Germán Robles as Timoteo de Salamanca
Eric del Castillo as Gaspar de Valdez
Isela Vega as La Paisana

Special participation

Luis José Santander as John Foreman
Rafael Inclán as Pirate
Emoé de la Parra as Mercedes Vda. de de Salamanca
Jorge Trejo as Ángel
Xorge Noble as Bermejo
Alejandro Ávila as Juancho
Hugo Macías Macotela as Marcelino
Tina Romero as Faustina
Iliana de la Garza as Cleotilde
Toño Mauri as Álvaro Fernández de la Cueva
Yoshio as El Chino
Luis Couturier as Padre Lorenzo
Evelyn Solares as Ágata
Rafael Rojas as José María de Valencia
María Dolores Oliva as Auxiliadora
Kokin as Bartolomé

Awards and nominations

References

External links

 at esmas.com 

2007 telenovelas
Mexican telenovelas
2007 Mexican television series debuts
2008 Mexican television series endings
Spanish-language telenovelas
Television shows set in Mexico
Televisa telenovelas
Piracy in fiction